Coppa Italia (English: "Italy Cup") is the men's association football tournament.

Coppa Italia may also refer to:

Association football
 Italian Women's Cup, women's tournament
 Coppa Italia Serie C, reserved for Serie C teams
 Coppa Italia Serie D, reserved for Serie D teams
 Coppa Italia Dilettanti, reserved for Eccellenza and Promozione teams

Other sports
 Italian Basketball Cup
 Coppa Italia (ice hockey)
 Italian Road Cycling Cup
 Coppa Italia (rugby union)
 Coppa Italia (men's water polo)

Sports terminology